Marcel Roth is a Swiss retired slalom canoeist who competed from the late 1950s to the late 1960s. He won three bronze medals in the C-1 team event at the ICF Canoe Slalom World Championships, earning them in 1959, 1961 and 1963.

References

External links 
 Marcel ROTH at CanoeSlalom.net

Swiss male canoeists
Possibly living people
Year of birth missing (living people)
Medalists at the ICF Canoe Slalom World Championships